Harriman or Hariman (variant Herriman) is a surname derived from the given name Herman, and in turn occurs as a placename derived from the surname in the United States.

Buildings
 Dr. O.B. Harriman House, a historic home in Hampton, Iowa, U.S.
 Harriman Historic District, a residential area in Bristol, Pennsylvania
 Hariman Sanatorium, Grand Forks, North Dakota
 Harriman School, a one-room schoolhouse in Sebec, Maine, U.S.

Inhabited places
 Harriman, New York, U.S.
 Harriman, Tennessee, U.S.

Transportation
 Harriman station, a metro station in Harriman, New York
 Harriman station (Erie Railroad), a former metro station in Harriman, New York
 Harriman Station, original name of Greystone station in Yonkers, New York City

Surname
 Harriman (surname)
 Robert Hariman (born 1951), American scholar

Parks
 Harriman State Park (Idaho), located on the Harriman Wildlife Refuge in Fremont County, Idaho
 Harriman State Park (New York), in Rockland and Orange counties, donated by the Harriman family
 Harriman State Park (disambiguation)

Other uses
 Harriman Glacier, Alaska, U.S.
 Harriman Institute, Columbia University, New York City

See also
 Herriman (disambiguation)